Darryl Gilmour (born February 13, 1967) is a Canadian retired professional ice hockey goaltender. He was selected by the Philadelphia Flyers in the third round (48th overall) of the 1985 NHL Entry Draft.

Awards and honours

 1987–88: Calder Cup champion (Hershey Bears)

References

External links

1967 births
Living people
Canadian ice hockey goaltenders
Fort Wayne Komets players
Hershey Bears players
Kalamazoo Wings (1974–2000) players
Madison Monsters players
Milwaukee Admirals players
Minnesota Moose players
Moose Jaw Warriors players
Muskegon Fury players
Nashville Knights players
New Haven Nighthawks players
Philadelphia Flyers draft picks
Phoenix Roadrunners (IHL) players
Portland Winterhawks players
Quad City Mallards (CoHL) players
Springfield Indians players
Ice hockey people from Winnipeg